Kenshi Harada (born 10 September 1998) is a Japanese judoka.

He won a medal at the 2021 World Judo Championships.

References

External links
 

1998 births
Living people
Japanese male judoka
World judo champions
20th-century Japanese people
21st-century Japanese people